The otter civet (Cynogale bennettii) is a semiaquatic viverrid native to Thailand, Malaysia, Indonesia and Brunei. It is listed as Endangered because of a serious ongoing population decline, estimated to be more than 50% over the past three generations (estimated to be 15 years), inferred from direct habitat destruction, and indirect inferred declines due to pollutants.

Cynogale is a monospecific genus.

Characteristics 

The otter civet possesses several adaptations to its habitat, including a broad mouth and webbed feet with naked soles and long claws. Its muzzle is long with numerous long whiskers. It is in many ways similar to the Hose's palm civet (Diplogale hosei) but has a shorter tail and no whitish underparts.

Distribution and habitat 
Otter civets are distributed in Sumatra, Borneo and peninsular Thailand. Preferred habitat appears to be lowland primary forest, but they have also been recorded in secondary forest, bamboo and logged forest. The supposed origin of Lowe's otter civet (C. lowei) known only from one holotype found in 1926 in northern Vietnam was not confirmed.
They are thought to be largely confined to peat swamp forests, though there are recent records from lowland dry forest.

In March 2005, an otter civet was photographed by a camera trap within an acacia plantation in central Sarawak during 1,632 trap-nights.

Ecology and behaviour 
The otter civet is a nocturnal species that obtains most of its food from the water, feeding on fish, crabs and freshwater mollusks. It can also climb to feed on birds and fruit. Given its rarity and secretive nature it is a very poorly known species.

Threats 
Conversion of peat swamp forests to oil palm plantations is a major threat. There is no evidence that the species is specifically hunted, but as a ground-dwelling species it is exposed to snares and other ground-level traps set for other species.
Clear-cut logging is one of the major factors contributing to decline in suitable habitat, and even selective logging may sufficiently alter habitat such that it is the species can no longer occupy it; combined, this loss of primary forest may be responsible for the current rarity of the otter civet.

Conservation 
Cynogale bennettii is listed in CITES Appendix II.

References

 Kanchanasakha, B. (1998). Carnivores of Mainland South East Asia. WWF, Bangkok.

External links

Viverrids
Carnivorans of Asia
Mammals of Borneo
Mammals of Brunei
Mammals of Indonesia
Carnivorans of Malaysia
Mammals of Thailand
Fauna of Sumatra
Mammals described in 1837
Taxa named by John Edward Gray
Endangered fauna of Asia